The processus (Latin: processus/ reambulatio, Hungarian: járás, Slovak: obvod/okres, German: Stuhlbezirk) was the subcounty administrative unit (district) in the Kingdom of Hungary between the 15th century and 1920. The Counties of the Kingdom of Hungary were divided into districts. This model has been used with the exception of the era of the short-lived Hungarian Soviet Republic and the time between 1950-1971 and 1983-2013.

Hungary under Habsburg rule